The Lower Logging Lake Snowshoe Cabin and Boathouse were built in 1933 in Glacier National Park near the southwestern end of Logging Lake.  The National Park Service Rustic boathouse stores rangers' canoes for patrolling the lake and their journeys between Upper and Lower Logging Lake patrol cabins. The Lower Logging Lake snowshoe cabin is nearby. They are a significant resources both architecturally and historically, constructed for backcountry patrols.

The Lower Logging Lake cabin was built by Austin Weikert, Ace Powell and Asa Peckfrom a standard Park Service plan G-931, designed by landscape architect Charles E. Peterson.

See also 
 Swanson Boathouse: another boathouse on the NRHP in Glacier National Park

References

Park buildings and structures on the National Register of Historic Places in Montana
Transportation buildings and structures on the National Register of Historic Places in Montana
Government buildings completed in 1933
National Park Service rustic in Montana
National Register of Historic Places in Flathead County, Montana
Log buildings and structures on the National Register of Historic Places in Montana
Boathouses on the National Register of Historic Places
1933 establishments in Montana
National Register of Historic Places in Glacier National Park
Log cabins in the United States